The 2008 South American Rugby Championship was the 30th edition of the now multi-divisional rugby competition involving the top rugby nations from South America.

Division A consisted of three teams and was played on a home and away basis.  Two points are awarded for a win and one for a draw.

Argentina won the tournament, playing with the "A" team.

Standings

Results

External links

 IRB – South American Championship 2008

2008
2008 rugby union tournaments for national teams
A
2008 in Argentine rugby union
rugby union
rugby union
International rugby union competitions hosted by Chile
International rugby union competitions hosted by Uruguay